Ágúst Már Jónsson (born 17 August 1960) is an Icelandic former footballer who played as a defender. He won 23 caps for the Iceland national football team between 1986 and 1989. In September 1989, he suffered a neck injury in a game against East Germany, effectively ending his career.

He later coached Afturelding men's and women's teams.
He co-coached Knattspyrnufélag Reykjavíkur men's team in 2000.

References

External links
 

1960 births
Living people
Agust Mar Jonsson
Association football defenders
BK Häcken players
Agust Mar Jonsson
Agust Mar Jonsson
Agust Mar Jonsson
Agust Mar Jonsson